The Lisbon & Estoril Film Festival (LEFFEST), formerly known as Estoril Film Festival, (also known as Lisbon & Sintra Film Festival) is an annual international film festival held in November in Estoril, on the Portuguese Riviera. Established in 2006, the competition section is open to international films, animation, fiction and documentaries. It awards the Silver Seagull Award for Best Film, amongst others.
In 2017, the festival moved to Sintra and named as 'Lisbon & Sintra Film Festival'.

Awards

 LEFFEST Best Film Award 
 Jury Prize João Bénard da Costa
 Jury Special Prize - Best Director
  Jury Special Prize - Relevação

Awards ceremonies
The following is a listing of Lisbon & Sintara Film Festiva ceremonies .

References

External links

Official site

Film festivals in Portugal
Film Festival
Culture in Cascais
Estoril
Film Festival
Annual events in Portugal
2006 establishments in Portugal
Recurring events established in 2006
Tourist attractions in Lisbon District
Autumn events in Portugal